Ko Chia-yen (born 10 January 1985), also known as Alice Ko, is a Taiwanese actress.

Career 
Ko's debut acting role was in the 2006 film Do Over, by award-winning director Cheng Yu-chieh. Subsequently, she had starring roles in the films Miao Miao (2008), Monga (2010) and Night Market Hero (2011). She first came to prominence for her role in the domestic hit series Office Girls (2011), in which she played a marketing specialist. She is also known for her roles in the drama series Marry Me, or Not? and Someday Or One Day, for which she won the Golden Bell Award for Best Actress in 2016 and 2020 respectively.

Personal life
Beginning 2012, Ko has been in a relationship with actor-singer Hsieh Kun-da, whom she had met on the set of the television series Gung Hay Fat Choy. After five years of dating, Ko and Hsieh married on December 3, 2017. They held their wedding ceremony at Marriot Hotel Taipei the following year on September 15.

Filmography

Television series

Film

Music video appearances

Published works

Discography

Singles

Awards and nominations

References

External links

 
 
 
 

1985 births
Living people
Taiwanese television actresses
Taiwanese film actresses
21st-century Taiwanese actresses
Actresses from Taipei
Shih Chien University alumni